Johno or Johnno may be the name or nickname of:

Fictional characters 
 Johnno, the protagonist of the novel Johnno
 Johnno, a character in the short film Johnno's Dead
 Johnno Brewer
 Johnno Dean
 Captain Johnno

People 
 Johnno Cotterill (born 1987), Australian water polo player
 Johno Johnson (1930–2017), Australian politician
 Johnno Mann (1896–1973), Australian politician
 Johnno Stuntz (1884–1917), Australian rugby league footballer and soldier

See also 
 Johnathon
 Jono (disambiguation)